Chryseobacterium rigui  is a Gram-negative, rod-shaped and non-motile bacteria from the genus of Chryseobacterium.

References

Further reading

External links
Type strain of Chryseobacterium rigui at BacDive -  the Bacterial Diversity Metadatabase

rigui
Bacteria described in 2013